The American Osler Society is an organisation dedicated to the history of medicine and focuses on the "life, teachings, and ethical example of Sir William Osler". It works in co-operation with the Osler Library of the History of Medicine at McGill University and consists of a group of physicians, medical historians, and other related professions united by "the common purpose of keeping alive the memory of Sir William Osler"

In keeping Osler's memory, the society publishes a newsletter, The Oslerian.

Origins
John P. McGovern, from Houston, Texas, and Alfred Henderson from Washington, were concerned over the perceived lessening humane effect of science on medical education and the increasing threat of technology. Together they formed the American Osler Society in 1970. William B. Bean became the first president, George Harrell the first vice-president, followed by Tom Durant as second vice-president. McGovern became the first secretary and the position of "historian" was created in 2000.

The statement of purpose;
The purpose of the Society is to unite, into an organized group, physicians, and others allied to the profession, with a common interest in memorializing and perpetuating the lessons of the life and teachings of William Osler; to meet periodically for the purpose of presentation and discussion ofpapers on the life and influence of Osler upon the profession, and to publish these essays as a Proceedings of the Society; to continually place before the profession a reminder of the high principles of life and humanism in practice of Osler, and to introduce these things to those entering the profession.
 
Osler's Oxford students, Wilburt C. Davison, Emile Holman, and Wilder Penfield, were named the three Honorary Members.

Logo
A latchkey represents the logo of the society. A number of junior medical staff were given the keys to Osler's home library in Baltimore, by Osler himself. These favoured staff members who included Harvey Cushing, became known as "latch-keyers".

Activities

The society works in co-operation with the Osler Library of the History of Medicine at McGill University and consists of a group of physicians, medical historians, and other related professions united by the aim of keeping Osler's memory. The society meets annually each spring.

Between 1970 and 2007, the society had witnessed over 700 presentations, of which about half have been centred around Osler's personal and professional life.

In May 2003, the American Osler Society, the Osler Club of London and the Japanese Osler Society came together in Edinburgh.

Publications

Selected presentations have been published as the persisting Osler in the quarterly The Oslerian.

Awards
The William Osler Academy Awards was initiated by the co-operation of the Osler Library of the History of Medicine at McGil and the American Osler Society.

Bean prize
The society supports the student "Bean" prize for research in medical history.

Selected publications
"The Persisting Osler II: Selected Transactions of the American Osler Society 1981-1990", 27 September 1995, Gerald Tremblay, Journal of the American Medical Association, pp. 274(12):990-991, 
"Review: The Persisting Osler III: Selected Transactions of the American Osler Society, 1991–2000", S. Ryan Gregory,Journal of the History of Medicine and Allied Sciences, Volume 59, Issue 1, January 2004, pp. 156–158, 
American Osler Society,

See also
 List of presidents of the American Osler Society

References 

Medical and health organizations based in the United States
William Osler
1970 in medicine